Saint Leonorus (or Leonorious, Leonorius, Léonor, Lunaire; died 560) was a Welsh monk who was active in Brittany.

Life

Saint Leonorius was born in Wales, son of King Hoel I and Saint Koupaïa (Pompeia of Langoat).
He was consecrated as a bishop by Saint Dubricius. 
He founded a monastery at Pontual to the south of Loctudy, Brittany.
He is said to have hung his coat on a sunbeam.
He died about 570.
His feast day is 1 July.

Monks of Ramsgate account

The monks of St Augustine's Abbey, Ramsgate, wrote in their Book of Saints (1921),

Owen's account

Robert Owen (1820–1902) in his Sanctorale Catholicum under July 1 wrote,

Butler's account

The hagiographer Alban Butler (1710–1773) wrote in his Lives of the Fathers, Martyrs, and Other Principal Saints, under July 1,

Notes

Citations

Sources

 

 

6th-century Frankish saints
560 deaths